Halvard Bjørkvik (9 October 1924 – 17 June 2021) was a Norwegian historian.

Career
He was born in Finnøy. He was manager of the Norwegian Museum of Cultural History from 1975, and was appointed adjunct professor at the University of Oslo from 1984, promoted to professor in 1990. His research focused on the agrarian history. He was decorated with the King's Medal of Merit in gold in 2006.

Selected publications

Death
He died in June 2021 at the age of 96.

References

1924 births
2021 deaths
People from Finnøy
20th-century Norwegian historians
Historians of agriculture
Academic staff of the University of Oslo
Recipients of the King's Medal of Merit in gold